is a junction passenger railway station located in the city of Higashimurayama, Tokyo, Japan, operated by the private railway operator Seibu Railway.

Lines
Higashi-Murayama Station is served by the Seibu Shinjuku Line, the Seibu Kokubunji Line, and the Seibuen Line. It is 26.0 km from the Tokyo terminus of the Seibu Shinjuku Line at Seibu Shinjuku Station and 7.8 kilometers from the terminus of the Seibu Kokubunji Line at Kokubunji Station. All trains (including limited express services) stop at this station. It is also the terminus station of the Seibuen Line.

Station layout
Higashi-Murayama Station has two entrances, east and west, with one set of ticket barriers located centrally above the tracks. The platforms are connected by three overhead passageways. The station has three island platforms serving six tracks.

Platforms

History
The station opened on 21 December 1894.

Station numbering was introduced on all Seibu Railway lines during fiscal 2012, with Higashi-Murayama Station becoming "SS21" for the Shinjuku Line and "SK05" for the Kokubunji and Seibuen Lines.

In 2015, construction began on a new elevated station facility for all lines. The relocation of all services into the new elevated structure is scheduled to take place in 2024.

Accidents
On 24 December 2011, at 16:40, the seventh car of an 8-car train forming a service from Seibuen to Seibu-Shinjuku derailed as the train approached the station, blocking the line for the rest of the day. None of the approximately 450 passengers on board were injured in the accident.

Passenger statistics
In fiscal 2019, the station was the 19th busiest on the Seibu network with an average of 48,934 passengers daily. 

The passenger figures for previous years are as shown below.

Surrounding area
To the east of the station is an Ito-Yokado department store, the Central Public Civic Hall, and Higashimurayama Central Post Office as well as Higashimurayama City Hall.

Buses for Tachikawa Station depart from the west side of the station. A bus departs from the east side to make a loop within Higashimurayama. Taxis depart from both sides, also.

See also
 List of railway stations in Japan

References

External links

 Seibu Station information 

Railway stations in Japan opened in 1894
Railway stations in Tokyo
Seibu Shinjuku Line
Seibu Kokubunji Line
Seibu Seibuen Line
Higashimurayama, Tokyo